Tobah is a village and union council of Jhelum District in the Punjab Province of Pakistan. It is part of Pind Dadan Khan Tehsil. The Postal Code is 49030. The last registered chairman of the Union Council 42 of Tobah is Muhammad Iqbal.

Until the late 1990s, the town of Tobah had a small population with a couple of schools and a Basic Health Unit. However, the town became much more significant after the completion of the M2 project in 1997. With the construction of Lillah Exit Toll Plaza, the driving distance to major cities like Rawalpindi and Lahore was greatly reduced and this created opportunities for the development of the town. 

The land is generally arid, but still teems with lush green fields. The climate is mostly warm, however the temperature drops dramatically in the winter. The major crop in the area is wheat, but a few vegetables are cultivated as well. Most of the population of Tobah is employed in agriculture, but there is also a commercial sector as well as those working for the armed forces or the revenue department of Pakistan.

Location 
Tobah is a village located in Tehsil Pind Dadan Khan, District Jhelum. It lies on Lillah - Pind Dadan Khan Road and is bounded by Saroba, Mathianay Dere, Athar and Karooli as the neighbouring villages. The famous river Jhelum flows in the South from East to West.

Income 
Agriculture is the main source of income.

Education 
 Government boys high school, Tohah.
Government Girls high school, Tobah.
Community Model school, Tobah.
 Brain Seed School System Tobah
 Allied School Tobah
 Educator School Tobah

Population 
Approximately 15000 people reside in this town. It has status of a union council. Chaudhry Fateh Muhammad Kadial (Late) served as first chairman of Tobah Union Council back in 1960s.

Villages in union council 
 Athar
 Bhelowal
 Saroba
 Tobah

Major Castes
Basra
 SYED (SADAAT)
 Jutt Athroo
 Bhulla
 Gondal
 Kurar
 Mahar
Janjua Rajput
 Khokhar
 Kadyal (also pronounced as "Qadiyal")
 Bakhial 
Qureshi 
 Awan
Mughal(Badshah)
Bhatti
 Toori
 Hitmal
 Maken

References 

Populated places in Tehsil Pind Dadan Khan
Union councils of Pind Dadan Khan Tehsil
Villages in Pind Dadan Khan Tehsil